The 1990–91 Scottish First Division season was won by Falkirk, who were promoted along with Airdrieonians to  the Premier Division. Clyde and Brechin City were relegated to the Second Division.

Table

References

Scottish First Division seasons
2
Scot